Eutropius (AD363–387) was a Roman official and historian. His book, Breviarium Historiae Romanae, summarizes events from the founding of Rome in the 8th century BC down to the author's lifetime. Appreciated by later generations for its clear presentation and writing style, the Breviarium can be used as a supplement to more comprehensive Roman historical texts which have survived in fragmentary condition.

Life
The exact background and birthplace of Eutropius is disputed. Some scholars claim he was born in Burdigala (Bordeaux) and was a man of medicine. Others, however, most notably Harold W. Bird, have dismissed these claims as being highly unlikely. Eutropius has been referred to as 'Italian' in other sources and supposedly held estates in Asia. Aside from that, his name was Greek, making it unlikely he came from Gaul. Confusion about this has arisen due to the fact that Eutropius was a popular name in late antiquity. He was, however, almost certainly a pagan and remained one under the emperor Julian's Christian successors.

He served as the imperial secretary in Constantinople. He accompanied Julian the Apostate (.361–363) on his expedition against the Sassanids in 363. He survived at least as late as the reign of the emperor Valens (364–378), to whom he dedicated his Summary of Roman History. Eutropius may have been the same Eutropius that was proconsul, or Governor of Asia from 371 to 372. He may have also been the Praetorian Prefect of the Illyrian Provinces from 380 to 381, as well possibly being a consul in 387.

Work
His Summary of Roman History is a ten-chapter compendium of Roman history from its foundation to the short reign of Jovian. It was compiled with considerable care from the best accessible authorities; it was written in a clear and simple style; and it treats its subjects with general impartiality. The message of the book was simple, that Romans always overcome their problems. This theme became especially important after the Battle of Adrianople. Eutropius stressed the importance of the Senate in his work. This is probably secretly advice to Valens. For the Republican period, Eutropius depended upon an epitome of Livy. For the Empire, he appears to have used Suetonius and the now lost Enmannsche Kaisergeschichte. At the end, he probably made use of his own personal experiences. The fact that the work ends with the reign of Jovian implies that it was written during the reign of either Valentinian I or Valens. If that was true, than the work would have been written between 364 and 378.

Legacy
The independent value of his Summary is small, but it sometimes fills a gap left by the more authoritative records. It is particularly useful to historians for its account of the First Punic War, as no copy of Livy's original books for that period have survived.

Its stylistic and methodological virtues caused it to be much used by later Roman chroniclers. In particular, it received expanded editions by Paul the Deacon and Landolf Sagax that repeated the original text and then continued it into the reigns of Justinian the Great and Leo the Armenian respectively. It was translated into Greek by Paeanius around 380 and by Capito Lycius in the 6th century. The latter translation has survived almost in its entirety.

Although Eutropius's style contains some idiosyncrasies, the work's plain style made it long a favorite elementary Latin schoolbook. A scholarly edition was compiled by H. Droysen in 1879, containing Capito Lycius's Greek edition and the expanded Latin editions of Paul and Landolf. There have been numerous English editions and translations, including Bird's.

References

Citations

Bibliography
 
 .
 
 .

External links

 Online version of a 1559/61 Basel edition of the Breviarium with detailed comments by Glareanus and other humanists (Latin)
Eutropius, Abridgement of Roman History, John Selby Watson (translator), (1853) (from Forum Romanum; both Latin text and English translation)
Eutropius, Abridgement of Roman History, John Selby Watson (translator), (1886) (from The Tertullian Project; only English translation)
Eutropius, Abridgement of Roman History, Lamberto Bozzi (translator), (2019) (from CRT Pesaro; both Latin text and English translation)
Eutropius, Eutropii Breviarium (from The Latin Library; only Latin text)
Eutropius, Eutropi Breviarium ab urbe condita cum versionibus graecis et Pauli Landolfique additamentis, Ed. Droysen, Hans. (from Monumenta Germaniae Historica Digital); Image files include the preface, Greek and Latin text, critical apparatus, appendices and indices
The Chinese translation of Eutropi Breviarium

4th-century historians
4th-century Latin writers
4th-century Romans
4th-century Roman consuls
Imperial Roman consuls
Latin historians
Writers from Bordeaux
Late-Roman-era pagans